Finnegan Oldfield (born 10 January 1991) is a French-British actor, who has appeared in more than thirty films since 2003.

Background

Career
In 2005, age 14, Oldfield landed the lead role in the TV film L'Île Atlantique. He dropped out of school at the age of 15.

Oldfield received a César nomination in 2016 for Les Cowboys and in 2018 for Reinventing Marvin.

Filmography

References

External links 

1991 births
Living people
People from Lewes
French male film actors
English male film actors